The Drishadvati river (IAST:, "She with many stones") is a river hypothesized by Indologists to identify the route of the Vedic river Saraswati and the state of Brahmavarta. According to Manusmriti, the Brahmavarta, where the Rishis composed the Vedas and other Sanskrit texts of the Vedic religion, was at the confluence of the Saraswati and Drishadvati rivers during the Vedic period.

Location
Although the Drishadvati is mentioned several times in Sanskrit Granthas, a detailed description of the river is not found in other ancient literature and this has generated speculation about its source and route. The Latyayana Srautasutra (10.17) describes it as a seasonal river, with the Saraswati a perennial river until its vinasana (10.15-19).

The Drishadvati is mentioned in Brahmanas written primarily in the state of Brahmavarta. According to these texts, the river originated in the pot of Brahma: Pushkar Lake, near Ajmer. The Sarasvati, with four branches flowing in different directions, originated in the hills near Pushkar. Drishadvati  was the branch flowing north. Most of the ashrams of the Rishis who compiled the Rigveda were on the river, between Pushkar and Dhosi Hill in Brahmavarta.  According to the Rigveda, the Drishadvati was preferred for religious sacrifices by the Vedic people.

In the Manu Smriti, the Drishadvati and the Sarasvati define the boundaries of the Vedic state of Brahmavarta: "It says that the land, created by the Gods, which lies between the two divine rivers Sarasvati and Drishadvati, the (sages) call Brahmavarta." The text also says that although the Sarasvati formed the northern boundary of Kuru Pradesh, the Drishadvati flowed in south of Kuru Pradesh and north of Brahmavarta. According to the Mahabharata, the southern boundary of Kuru Pradesh was Guru Drona's ashram (present-day Gurgaon at one end and Rohtak and Jhajjar at the other); therefore, the Drishadvati flowed in the southern portions of these cities. Although about 100 streams flowed south to north in the -wide Aravalli Range during the Vedic period, the only large river is the present-day Sahibi. The Sahibi has a lower flow at present because of low rainfall in its catchment area and has a wide, dry bed which carries water from the districts of Jaipur, Sikar, Alwar Rewari, Jhajjar, Rohtak and Delhi in Yamuna.

The Drishadvati is mentioned in the Rigveda (RV 3.23.4) with the Sarasvati and Apaya. According to the Rigveda, the Brahmanas and the Kalpa, Vedic sacrifices were performed on this river and on the Sarasvati. In the Srimad Bhagavatam, the Drishadvati  is a transcendental river.

Origin
The Drishadvati was identified by Oldham as the Chautang River, and in 2000 Talageri identified it with the  Hariyupiya and Yavyavati Rivers. In 1871 Alexander Cunningham identified the Rakshi River as the old Drishadvati and demonstrated its flow to have been from Chunar, near Varanasi. According to the Brahman Granthas, before its confluence with the Saraswati the Drishadvati flowed from the east to west. The Saraswati flowed from north to south during the Vedic period close to Aravallies, and the Drishadvati flowed from south to north through the Aravallis from Pushkar Lake in Rajasthan to Nangal Chaudhery in southern Haryana. The river then turned to reach Satnali and meet the Saraswati. After major tectonic/seismic activity in the Aravalli Range some 6500 years ago, the river Saraswati changed its course, to what is now known as Ghaggar-Hakra river bed at present times, and dried up later.

According to Prabhat Ranjan Sarkar, the Drishadvati originated in the Vindya Mountains of Baghelkhand and joined the Charmanwati. After an earthquake, it flowed north to join the Son River. Sarkar believes that the Drishadvati is the Ghaghara.

See also
Ghaggar-Hakra River

References 

 Amal Kar, Bimal Ghose: Drishadvati River System of India: An assessment and new findings. The Geographical Journal, Vol 150, No 2, 1984.
 Shrikant G. Talageri, The Rigveda, a historical analysis, Aditya Prakashan, New Delhi (2000), chapter 4

Rigvedic rivers